Ivica Obrvan (born 2 June 1966) is a Croatian retired handball player and current coach. He last coached RK Zagreb.

Honours

Player
Metković
Croatian First A League 
Runner-up (1): 1998–99
Yugoslav Third League 
Winner (1): 1985–86

Zagreb
Croatian First A League 
Winner (5): 1991–92, 1992–93, 1993–94, 1994–95, 1995–96
Croatian Cup 
Winner (5): 1992, 1993, 1994, 1995, 1996
Yugoslav First League 
Winner (2): 1988–89, 1990–91
Yugoslav Cup 
Winner (1): 1991
European Champions Cup 
Winner (2): 1991–92, 1992–93
EHF Champions League 
Finalist (1): 1994–95
EHF Super Cup 
Winner (1): 1993

Player-coach
Metković
Croatian First A League 
Runner-up (2): 1999–00, 2000–01
Croatian Cup 
Winner (1): 2001
EHF Cup 
Winner (1): 2000
Runner-up (1): 2001

Coach
Metković
Croatian First League 
Winner (1): 2001–02 (revoked administratively)
Runner-up (3): 2002–03, 2003–04, 2004–05

Agram Medveščak
Croatian First League 
Runner-up (1): 2005–06
Croatian Cup
Runner-up (1): 2006

Gorenje Velenje
Slovenian First League
Winner (1): 2008–09
Slovenian Cup
Runner-up (1): 2009–10
Slovenian Super Cup
Winner (1): 2009
EHF Cup
Runner-up (1): 2009

Zagreb
Dukat Premier League 
Winner (2): 2010–11, 2011–12
Croatian Cup
Winner (2): 2011, 2012
SEHA League
Third (1): 2011–12

Orders
 Order of Danica Hrvatska with face of Franjo Bučar – 1995

References

1966 births
Living people
Sportspeople from Metković
Croatian handball coaches
Croatian expatriate sportspeople in France
Mediterranean Games gold medalists for Croatia
Competitors at the 1993 Mediterranean Games
RK Medveščak Zagreb
Mediterranean Games medalists in handball
Handball coaches of international teams
Croatian male handball players